Ellacombe Football Club was an English football club based in Torquay, Devon. The club existed until 1910, before merging with the original Torquay United to form Torquay Town.  A further merger between Torquay Town and Babbacombe resulted in the formation of the current Torquay United.

History
Ellacombe were one of a number of football clubs formed in Torquay around the turn of the 20th century.  They were founder members of the Torquay & District League in 1903, a competition which they won in its inaugural season and again in the 1905–06 season.  Ellacombe played their home games at Plainmoor from 1904 onwards after the current residents, Torquay Athletic RFC made a switch to Torquay's Recreation Ground. The move left fellow football club Torquay United homeless and helped fuel a rivalry which was fast developing between Ellacombe, United and the third of Torquay's most prominent football teams, Babbacombe.  By the 1907–08 season, all three sides were playing in the Torquay & District League with the championship always being won by one of the three sides during the league's first six seasons in operation.

By 1910, Devon's two most successful football clubs, Plymouth Argyle and Exeter City, had turned professional and there was general feeling in Torquay that the three rivals would need to amalgamate if the town was to have a professional team of its own.  Although Babbacombe were firmly against any kind of merger, Ellacombe and Torquay United agreed to join forces and a new club, named Torquay Town was formed.  Torquay Town existed until 1921 when Babbacombe finally succumbed to a merger, whereupon the three local rivals were joined together at last to (once again) become Torquay United.

Honours
Torquay & District League
Champions (2): 1903–04, 1905–06

Seasons
{|class="wikitable"
|-bgcolor="#efefef"
! Season
! Division
! Position
! Pl.
! W
! D
! L
! F
! A
! P
|-
|align=center|1903–04
|align=center|Torquay & District League
|align=center|1st
|align=center|
|align=center|
|align=center|
|align=center|
|align=center|
|align=center|
|align=center|
|-
|align=center|1904–05
|align=center|Torquay & District League
|align=center|3rd
|align=center|
|align=center|
|align=center|
|align=center|
|align=center|
|align=center|
|align=center|
|-
|align=center|1905–06
|align=center|Torquay & District League
|align=center|1st
|align=center|
|align=center|
|align=center|
|align=center|
|align=center|
|align=center|
|align=center|
|-
|align=center|1906–07
|align=center|Torquay & District League
|align=center|?
|align=center|
|align=center|
|align=center|
|align=center|
|align=center|
|align=center|
|align=center|
|-
|align=center|1907–08
|align=center|Torquay & District League
|align=center|2nd
|align=center|12
|align=center|8
|align=center|1
|align=center|2
|align=center|29
|align=center|11
|align=center|17
|-
|align=center|1908–09
|align=center|Torquay & District League
|align=center|5th
|align=center|14
|align=center|7
|align=center|1
|align=center|6
|align=center|32
|align=center|33
|align=center|15
|-
|align=center|1909–10
|align=center|Torquay & District League
|align=center|8th
|align=center|16
|align=center|3
|align=center|2
|align=center|11
|align=center|14
|align=center|50
|align=center|8
|-
|}

References

External links

Torquay United F.C.
Defunct football clubs in Devon
Defunct football clubs in England
Association football clubs disestablished in 1910
1910 disestablishments in England
South Devon Football League